Leo Cotterell (born 2 September 1974) is an English football defender. Attended 
Morley Memorial Primary School followed by Coleridge Community College. After showing early promise went on to pursue a career in football.

References

Since 1888... The Searchable Premiership and Football League Player Database (subscription required)
Pride of Anglia

1974 births
Living people
English footballers
Association football defenders
Premier League players
Ipswich Town F.C. players
AFC Bournemouth players
Rushden & Diamonds F.C. players
King's Lynn F.C. players